"Feelings of Forever", the final single from the album Tiffany by Tiffany, was released in the summer of 1988. It was considered a flop in most areas of the world, but was a very minor success in the U.S. and the U.K. The music video made for the single's release failed to generate any success on MTV where her previous videos were hits on the channel.

Track listings and formats
7" single / Japanese 3" CD single

 "Feelings of Forever"
 "Out Of My Heart"

Cassette single / CD single / UK 12" single

 "Feelings of Forever"
 "Out Of My Heart"
 "Heart Don't Break Tonight"

Chart performance

References

Tiffany Darwish songs
1988 singles
Pop ballads
MCA Records singles
1987 songs